The Very Revd. John Herbert Severn Wild (1904–1992) was Dean of Durham and Master of University College, University of Oxford.

J. H. S. Wild was an undergraduate at Brasenose College, Oxford (1923–27) where he studied Greats. He became an assistant curate in Newcastle upon Tyne.

Wild was then a Chaplain Fellow of University College from 1933 to 1945, before becoming Master. He was the only clerical Master of University College during the 20th century and was not a noted academic.

In 1951, he was elected as Dean at Durham Cathedral. He succeeded Cyril Alington, whose eldest son, Giles Alington, was a Fellow at University College from 1944 to 1956, including while Wild was Master. Wild later became Dean Emeritus.

He married Margaret Elizabeth Everard Wainwright, who died on 21 October 2008 at the age of 86.

Books
 A Short Guide to the Cathedral Church of Durham (1957)

References

1904 births
1992 deaths
Alumni of Brasenose College, Oxford
British chaplains
Anglican chaplains
Fellows of University College, Oxford
Chaplains of University College, Oxford
Masters of University College, Oxford
Deans of Durham
Surtees Society